Eleanor of Austria (2 November 1534 – 5 August 1594) was Duchess of Mantua by marriage to William I, Duke of Mantua. She was the daughter of Ferdinand I, Holy Roman Emperor and Anna of Bohemia and Hungary.

Life

Eleanor was the eighth child and sixth daughter out of fifteen children born to Archduke Ferdinand of Austria (before his election as Holy Roman Emperor) and his wife Anna of Bohemia and Hungary. She was a sister of Johanna of Austria, who married Francesco I de' Medici, thus making Eleonora the aunt of Marie de' Medici, Queen of France.

Life in Mantua
She married William I, Duke of Mantua on 26 April 1561.

At about age 5, Eleanor's daughter Anne Catherine became severely ill and nearly died. She contracted a high fever and her extremities began to swell. For two years she was ill. Finally Eleanor and William appealed to the Virgin Mary with deep prayer, promising to raise Anne as a child of Mary if she lived on. Soon Anne became healthy again. Eleanor and William told their daughter of the Virgin Mary's intervention on her behalf and the promise they had made. From there out Eleanor educated and guided Anne Catherine in the cultivation of devotion to Mary. Throughout childhood Anne Catherine displayed a consistent sense of piety.

Eleonor died on 5 August 1594 at the age of 59, she had been a widow since 1587 when her husband died. She was one of the last children of Ferdinand and Anna alive at the time, the only other sibling alive at the time of her death was her brother Ferdinand II, Archduke of Austria who only died one year later.

Issue
Her children were:

Vincent I, Duke of Mantua (21 September 1562 – 9 February 1612). Married Eleonora de' Medici (Eleanor's niece).
Margherita Gonzaga (27 May 1564 – 6 January 1618). Married Alfonso II d'Este.
Anna Caterina Gonzaga (17 January 1566 – 3 August 1621). Married her maternal uncle Ferdinand II, Archduke of Austria.

Ancestors

References

16th-century House of Habsburg
16th-century Austrian women
House of Gonzaga
1534 births
1594 deaths
Austrian princesses
Duchesses of Mantua
Marchionesses of Montferrat
Duchesses of Montferrat
Nobility from Vienna
Daughters of emperors
Children of Ferdinand I, Holy Roman Emperor
Daughters of kings